Frostburn is a supplemental book to the 3.5 edition of the Dungeons and Dragons fantasy role-playing game.

Contents
Frostburn provides rules for adventuring in a cold environment as well as an environment known as frostfell, which is a sort of arctic environment with extreme (sometimes even magical) cold.

The book contains information about cold and how it affect characters in the game, as well as various monsters, races, weapons, and spells that can be found in a Frostfell environment.

Publication history
Frostburn was written by Wolfgang Baur, James Jacobs, and George Strayton, and published in September 2004.  Cover art was by Sam Wood, with interior art by Steve Belledin, Mitch Cotie, Ed Cox, Dennis Crabapple McClain, Steve Ellis, David Griffith, David Hudnut, Dana Knutson, Doug Kovacs, and Dan Scott.

This book follows two other books, Sandstorm and Stormwrack, which also deal with specific environments.

Reception

Reviews
Black Gate #9 (Fall 2005)

References

Dungeons & Dragons sourcebooks
Role-playing game supplements introduced in 2004